The Chicago, St. Paul, Minneapolis, and Omaha Turntable in Currie, Minnesota was built in 1901.  It was listed on the National Register of Historic Places in 1977.  It has also been known as the Currie Railroad Turntable or the Currie Manually Operated Railroad Turntable.

Built in 1901, it is a manually operated railway turntable built by the American Bridge Company for the end of a Chicago, St. Paul, Minneapolis and Omaha Railway branch line.

There is mention of a railway roundhouse having existed, but no specific evidence this was in fact a roundhouse as opposed to a single engine workshop/shed.

References

Railway turntables
National Register of Historic Places in Murray County, Minnesota
Buildings and structures completed in 1901
Railway buildings and structures on the National Register of Historic Places in Minnesota